Tyias Charles Browning (born 27 May 1994), also known as Jiang Guangtai, is a professional footballer who plays as a defender for Chinese Super League club Shanghai Port. Born in Liverpool, England to a mother of Cantonese descent, he has represented the China national team since 2021.

In addition to playing as a centre-back, Browning can also play as a right-back.

Youth
Browning was born in Liverpool, England. He attended the same school as his former Wigan Athletic teammates Lee Nicholls and Jack Phillips. He is eligible to play for China national team because his maternal grandfather Ying-Wing Chiang (1939–1992), a chef in Macclesfield, England, is Cantonese, having emigrated from Meige Village, Xinhui County, China. His maternal grandfather married a Black British woman. In 2019, Browning became a naturalised Chinese citizen, benefiting from the Chinese football naturalisation policies.

Club career

Everton

Browning joined Everton in 2004 at age ten. Prior to that, he started at the local team for eight months before joining Everton. After progressing through the youth team for Everton, Browning began to play in the club's reserve, where he became a regular. He then helped Everton Reserves win the U18 Premier League title in the 2010–11 season.

Browning developed at the club's reserves, playing in the right–back position for the side throughout his time there. Browning also received a captain armband for the club's reserves, as he develops. At the end of the 2013–14 season, Browning won the Under-21s Player of the Season at the club's end of season awards night.

On 30 December 2012, he was called up to the first team for the first time as an unused substitute as Everton lost 2–1 to Chelsea. On 26 July 2013, Browning signed his first professional contract with the club, keeping him until 2015.

In the 2014–15 season, Browning signed a three–year contract, keeping him until 2017. He made his first appearance for Everton's senior squad on 27 September 2014 at Anfield for the Merseyside Derby against Liverpool, coming on as a substitute to replace long-time Everton servant Tony Hibbert after 72 minutes with the scoreline 1–0 to Liverpool, as the game ended 1–1. Browning made another appearance in a follow–up match against Manchester United on 5 October 2014, coming on as a substitute to replace Hibbert again, in a 2–1 loss. Two months later, on 11 December 2014, he made his first start for the side, starting the whole game, in a 1–0 loss against Krasnodar. At the end of the 2014–15 season, Browning made three appearances in all competitions.

In the 2014–15 season, Browning made his first appearance of the season, coming on as a late substitute to replace Brendan Galloway, in a 3–0 win over Southampton on 15 August 2015. He then received a handful of first team appearances for the side this season. In one of the match against Swansea City on 19 September 2015, Browning was named Team of the Week after helping the side draw 0–0, keeping a clean sheet in the process. However, he suffered a knee injury during the club's win over Blackburn Rovers in the Lancashire Senior Cup, and was sidelined for the rest of the 2015–16 season.

After being sidelined for a long time, Browning returned to full fitness, playing 45 minutes, as Everton U23 lost 4-1 by Norwich City in the Premier League Cup in November 2016. He was then featured in the EFL Trophy against Blackpool, in a 5–4 defeat in the penalty shoot-out after the game was finished with a 1–1 draw on 8 November 2016. Despite returning to fitness, he was told by the club's management that he was to be loaned out for the rest of the 2016–17 season. After his loan spell at Sunderland ended, Browning was expected to be loaned out again, but the move failed to materialise. It was announced in January 2019 that Browning was expected to leave Everton, with his departure being imminent.

Loan spells
Browning joined Uwe Rösler's Wigan Athletic on a one-month loan on 10 January 2014. He made his professional debut a day later versus AFC Bournemouth in a 3–0 victory, replacing James Perch as a substitute. In a follow–up match, Browning then started the whole game as a right–back, as Wigan Athletic lost 3–0 against Doncaster Rovers, in what turned out to be his last appearance for the club. Afterwards, he returned to his parent club, Everton.

Browning signed a new two-and-a-half year deal at Everton and was then immediately sent on loan to Preston North End until the end of the 2016–17 season on 30 January 2017. The following day, he made his Preston North End debut, starting the whole game, in a 2–0 loss against Cardiff City. Browning became a first team regular for the side, playing in the right–back position in a number of matches. This lasted until he suffered a knee injury that kept him out for two months. He made his return to the starting lineup on 24 April 2017 against Newcastle United, where they lost 4–1. At the end of the 2016–17 season, having made eight appearances for Preston North End, Browning returned to his parent club.

On 8 July 2017, Browning joined relegated side Sunderland on a season long-deal, where he was reunited with Manager Simon Grayson, who played under him while at Preston North End. He made his Sunderland debut in the opening game of the season, where he started the whole game, in a 1–1 draw against Derby County. Since making his Sunderland debut, Browning established himself in the starting eleven for the side, playing in the centre–back position. However, Sunderland soon found themselves struggling in the league that saw them at the bottom of the table. After being sidelined with an injury that kept him out throughout October, he returned to the first team as a late substitute against Millwall on 18 November 2017. Browning continued to feature in the first team under the new management of Chris Coleman. Under Coleman, Browning's performance improved, where he kept four clean sheets for the side. Browning continued to feature in the first team until he suffered a groin injury during a 3–0 loss against Aston Villa on 6 March 2018 and was sidelined for the rest of the season. Without him, Sunderland struggled in the league for the rest of the season, leading to their relegation to League One. At the end of the 2017–18 season, Browning went on to make twenty–nine appearances in all competitions.

Guangzhou Evergrande
On 20 February 2019, Browning transferred to Chinese Super League club Guangzhou Evergrande for an undisclosed fee. On 5 March 2019, he made his debut for the club in a 2–0 home win over Japanese side Sanfrecce Hiroshima in the 2019 AFC Champions League. He would go on to establish himself as a regular within the team and go on to win the 2019 Chinese Super League title with the club.

In August 2022, Browning joined fellow Chinese Super League club Shanghai Port.

International career
Browning has represented England at under-17, under-19 and under-21 level. In addition to playing for England, he is eligible to play for China.

In 2010, Browning was featured four times, for England U17s, including being called up for the Nordic Tournament.

In March 2013, Browning was called up by England U19s for the first time, making his debut for the side in a 1–0 win over Turkey U19s. He went on to make four appearances for the U19 side.

In May 2014, Browning was called up to the under-21 squad for the first time. On 22 May 2014 Browning made his England U21 debut, playing the whole game in a 3–0 win over Qatar U21.

Browning, using his Chinese name of Jiang Guangtai, received his first call-up to the Chinese national team in 2020, but had to wait until their World Cup Qualifying match against Guam on 30 May 2021 to make his international debut.

Career statistics

International statistics

Honours

Club
Guangzhou Evergrande
Chinese Super League: 2019

See also 
List of Chinese naturalized footballers

References

External links

1994 births
Living people
Footballers from Liverpool
Chinese footballers
China international footballers
English footballers
England youth international footballers
English people of Chinese descent
Association football defenders
Everton F.C. players
Wigan Athletic F.C. players
Preston North End F.C. players
Sunderland A.F.C. players
Guangzhou F.C. players
Chinese Super League players
Premier League players
English Football League players
English expatriate footballers
Expatriate footballers in China
English expatriate sportspeople in China
Naturalized citizens of the People's Republic of China
Sportspeople of Chinese descent